Super Besse is a winter sports resort located in Massif Central, France.

Geography
Super Besse located in the commune of Besse-et-Saint-Anastaise (Parc naturel régional des volcans d'Auvergne in the department of Puy-de-Dôme, Auvergne). Situated approximately 50 km from Clermont-Ferrand, it is located at an altitude of 1350 m on the slopes of Puy de Sancy, Puy de la Perdrix and Puy Ferrand.

Facilities

The on piste skiing consists of 43 km distributed on 27 tracks (5 green, 9 blue, 9 red and 4 black) between 1300 m and 1840 m altitude, on the south-eastern slope of Puy de Sancy. It contains 21 ski lifts. It also includes 125 km of cross-country skiing.

The resort includes: 
 1 funitel with 20 places (new in 2008)
 4 chair-lifts
 16 ski-lifts.

Tour de France
Super-Besse hosted the first mountain finish of the 2008 Tour de France. The finish was at an altitude of 1289 m, whereas in previous years the finish was at 1350 m.

Tour de France stage finishes

Alejandro Valverde is listed as the winner for the 2008 stage as original stage winner Riccardo Riccò was removed from the classification after testing positive for the banned performance enhancer CERA.

Details of climb 
Starting from Besse-et-Saint-Anastaise (1040 m), the climb to Super Besse (1325 m) is 7.2 km long. Over this distance, the climb is 285 m (an average of 3.95%). The maximum gradient is 8.4%.

From the valley at Lomprat the total climb is 11 km at 4.7%.

External links

Super-Besse website
Super-Besse dans le Tour de France (Fr)

Tourist attractions in Puy-de-Dôme
Ski areas and resorts in France
Auvergne-Rhône-Alpes region articles needing translation from French Wikipedia